EKH may refer to:

 Elkhart station, a train station in Indiana, United States
 Ernst-Kirchweger-Haus, a building in Vienna
 Eliza Kelly Hall, a building on the Clarke University campus in Dubuque, Iowa, United States